The 2006 Welsh Open was a professional ranking snooker tournament that took place between 27 February and 5 March at the Newport Centre in Newport, Wales.

Ronnie O'Sullivan was the defending champion, but he lost his last 32 match against Ian McCulloch.

Stephen Lee won his fourth ranking title by defeating World Champion Shaun Murphy 9–4.

Tournament summary 

Defending champion Ronnie O'Sullivan was the number 1 seed with World Champion Shaun Murphy seeded 2. The remaining places were allocated to players based on the world rankings.

Prize fund 
The breakdown of prize money for this year is shown below:

Winner: £35,000
Runner Up: £17,500
Semi Finalist: £8,750
Quarter Finalist: £6,500
Last 16: £4,275
Last 32: £2,750
Last 48: £1,725
Last 64: £1,325

Stage two highest break: £2000
Stage two maximum break: £20,000

Main draw

Final

Qualifying

Qualifying for the tournament took place at Pontin's in Prestatyn, Wales  between 24 January and 26 January 2006.

Century breaks

Qualifying stage centuries

 139  Michael Judge
 135, 125  Scott MacKenzie
 135, 104  Lee Spick
 131, 106, 104  Ding Junhui
 130, 124, 100  Dave Gilbert
 130  Matthew Couch
 124  Dominic Dale
 124  Ricky Walden

 119  Fergal O'Brien
 112, 108  Stuart Bingham
 111, 102  Jamie Cope
 111  Patrick Wallace
 106  Dave Harold
 103  Andrew Norman
 102  Mark Allen
 100  David Roe

Televised stage centuries

 144  Robert Milkins
 141  Dave Harold
 138  Matthew Stevens
 135, 122, 113, 100  Ryan Day
 134, 120, 106, 102  Shaun Murphy
 133  Stephen Hendry
 131  Steve Davis
 128, 104, 102  Barry Hawkins

 122, 110  Ian McCulloch
 120, 100  Stephen Lee
 120  Joe Perry
 111  Neil Robertson
 107  Liang Wenbo
 103  Scott MacKenzie
 100  Anthony Hamilton
 100  John Higgins

References

Welsh Open (snooker)
Welsh Open
Open (snooker)
Welsh Open snooker in Newport